Antoine-Laurent Castellan (1772–1838) was a French painter, architect, and engraver.

Life
Castellan was born at Montpellier in 1772. After having studied landscape painting under Valenciennes, he visited Turkey, Greece, Italy, and Switzerland, and published several series of letters upon those parts, illustrated with views drawn and engraved by himself. His best-known work is the Moeurs, usages, costumes des Othomans, published in 1812, and highly praised by Lord Byron. He also wrote Etudes sur le Chateau de Fontainebleau, which was not published until after his death. He was also the inventor of a new process of painting in wax.

He died in Paris in 1838.

Works

References

Sources

 

18th-century French painters
French male painters
19th-century French painters
French engravers
18th-century engravers
19th-century engravers
1772 births
1838 deaths
People from Montpellier
Burials at Père Lachaise Cemetery
19th-century French male artists
18th-century French male artists